Nicolas Sarkis is a British financier and businessman. He is a former Goldman Sachs executive and the founding partner of the asset management firm AlphaOne Partners.

Sarkis authored the investment book, Fear and Greed: Investment Risks and Opportunities in a Turbulent World. Following its publication, it was nominated for the "FT/Goldman Sachs Best Business Book of the Year" award, while receiving positive reviews from The Times, Financial Times and MoneyWeek.

Early life
Sarkis is the son of his namesake and energy expert Nicolas Sarkis, who was founder of the Arab Petroleum Research Center. Sarkis' father, along with Abdullah Tariki and Juan Pablo Pérez Alfonso played a part in the creation of Organization of Petroleum Exporting Countries (OPEC).

During the Lebanese civil war, Sarkis and his family moved to France. While living in France, Sarkis studied at the ESSEC Business School. Following graduation, Sarkis moved into the field of Finance along with his two elder brothers. One of them studied at both Stanford and Oxford, before becoming a partner of LBO firm, PAI Partners and the other one attended Ecole Polytechnique, Harvard Business School and Stanford before becoming managing director of Bain Capital.

Career
After graduating from college, Sarkis was hired by Goldman Sachs and moved to New York City. He was hired by Goldman Sachs partner Robert K. Steel, who later became Under Secretary for the US Treasury. Sarkis started in the institutional equity division of the firm and was the youngest-ever Associate to be hired by Goldman Sachs at the time.

Sarkis moved to Goldman Sachs's London office, focusing on the US shares institutional business. After starting the new role in London, Sarkis impressed and later was named Vice-President of London-based operations for Goldman Sachs at the age of 26. His main aims were to increase transparency, via the elimination of conflicts of interest and more robust investment methodologies.

He left Goldman Sachs to found AlphaOne Partners. The investment group focused on investment advisory services for institutional investors, Sovereign Wealth Funds and high net worth families.

Sarkis has been a financial and investing commentator for the Wall Street Journal and also the Huffington Post. As founder of AlphaOne Partners, he was also interviewed by Thomson Reuters.

Sarkis is also a Trustee of Action Against Hunger, one of the largest global charities which fights against acute malnutrition.

Author
Sarkis is also an author and writer. He published his first investment book in September 2012, titled Fear and Greed: Investment Risks and Opportunities in a Turbulent World. The book received acclaim from a number of investment publications, including the Financial Times and also nominated for the Goldman Sachs Best Business Book of the Year Award.

The book received mainly positive reviews. MoneyWeek referred to the book as "a useful antidote to much of the conventional wisdom out there", while also stating that Sarkis' content made him "an original thinker".

Other book reviews included Giles Whittell of The Times who wrote, "Fear and Greed is superbly written and meticulously researched, providing great insights into the global investment climate." David Stevenson of the Financial Times commented "Fear and Greed tackles some of the most vital questions in financial markets today. It does so in an elegant and admirably concise fashion, offering some valuable and practical answers. Sarkis' work is a must-read for investors seeking inspiration for their portfolio."

References

British businesspeople
British writers
Year of birth missing (living people)
Living people